Dillingham Census Area is a census area located in the state of Alaska, United States. At the 2020 census, the population was 4,857, slightly up from 4,847 in 2010. It is part of the unorganized borough and therefore has no borough seat. Its largest community by far is the city of Dillingham, on a small arm of Bristol Bay on the Bering Sea.

Geography

Adjacent boroughs and census areas
 Bethel Census Area, Alaska - west/north
 Bristol Bay Borough, Alaska
 Lake and Peninsula Borough, Alaska - east

National protected areas
 Alaska Maritime National Wildlife Refuge (part of the Bering Sea unit)
 Hagemeister Island
 Togiak National Wildlife Refuge (part)
 Togiak Wilderness (part)

Demographics

At the 2000 census there were 4,922 people, 1,529 households, and 1,105 families living in the census area.  The population density was 0 people per square mile (0/km2).  There were 2,332 housing units at an average density of 0/sq mi (0/km2).  The racial makeup of the census area was 21.64% White, 0.37% Black or African American, 70.13% Native American, 0.61% Asian, 0.02% Pacific Islander, 0.55% from other races, and 6.68% from two or more races.  2.26% of the population were Hispanic or Latino of any race. 34.6% reported speaking Yupik or Eskimo at home .
Of the 1,529 households 45.30% had children under the age of 18 living with them, 51.10% were married couples living together, 15.00% had a female householder with no husband present, and 27.70% were non-families. 23.30% of households were one person and 3.60% were one person aged 65 or older.  The average household size was 3.20 and the average family size was 3.84.

The age distribution was 38.10% under the age of 18, 7.70% from 18 to 24, 28.90% from 25 to 44, 19.50% from 45 to 64, and 5.70% 65 or older.  The median age was 29 years. For every 100 females, there were 109.00 males.  For every 100 females age 18 and over, there were 108.80 males. The per capita income is estimated at 23,500 U.S. dollars per year.

Politics

Communities

Cities
Aleknagik
Clark's Point
Dillingham
Ekwok
Manokotak
New Stuyahok
Togiak

Census-designated places
Koliganek
Portage Creek
Twin Hills

See also

List of mountain peaks of North America
List of mountain peaks of the United States
List of mountain peaks of Alaska
List of airports in the Dillingham Census Area

References

External links

 Census Area map: Alaska Department of Labor

 
Alaska census areas
Bering Sea